Tariq Fazal Chaudhry (born 7 June 1969) is a Pakistani politician who served as Federal Minister for Capital Administration and Development, in Abbasi cabinet from August 2017 to May 2018. Previously he served as the Minister of State for Capital Administration and Development from November 2015 to July 2017 in the third Sharif ministry and from August 2017 to April 2018 in the Abbasi ministry. He had been a member of the National Assembly of Pakistan from March 2008 to May 2018.

Early life and education
Chaudhry was born on 7 June 1969 in Islamabad, Pakistan. He graduated from Rawalpindi Medical University.

Political career
Chaudhry ran for the seat of National Assembly of Pakistan from Constituency NA-49 (Islamabad-II) as a candidate of Pakistan Muslim League (N) (PML-N)  in 2002 Pakistani general election but was unsuccessful. He received 16,832 votes and lost the seat to Nayyar Hussain Bukhari.

Chaudhry was elected to the National Assembly as a candidate of PML-N from Constituency NA-49 (Islamabad-II) in 2008 Pakistani general election. He received 45,482 votes and defeated Nayyar Hussain Bukhari.

Chaudhry was re-elected to the National Assembly as a candidate of PML-N from Constituency NA-49 (Islamabad-II) in 2013 Pakistani general election. He received 94,106 votes and defeated a candidate of Pakistan Tehreek-e-Insaf.

In November 2015, he was inducted into the federal cabinet of the third Sharif ministry and was appointed as the Minister of State for Capital Administration and Development. He had ceased to hold ministerial office in July 2017 when the federal cabinet was disbanded following the resignation of Prime Minister Nawaz Sharif after Panama Papers case decision.

He has been the president of Islamabad wing of Pakistan Muslim League (N) in 2016.

Following the election of Shahid Khaqan Abbasi as Prime Minister of Pakistan in August 2017, he was inducted into the federal cabinet of Abbasi. He retained the cabinet portfolio of Minister of State for Capital Administration and Development. In December 2017, he named as property tax defaulter. In April 2018, he was elevated as federal minister and was appointed as Federal Minister for Capital Administration and Development in the cabinet of Prime Minister Shahid Khaqan Abbasi. Upon the dissolution of the National Assembly on the expiration of its term on 31 May 2018, Chaudhry ceased to hold the office as Federal Minister for Capital Administration and Development.

References

Living people
Pakistan Muslim League (N) politicians
Punjabi people
Politicians from Islamabad
1969 births
Pakistani MNAs 2008–2013
Pakistani MNAs 2013–2018